Blattmann is a surname. Notable people with the surname include:

Albert Blattmann (1904–1967), Swiss cyclist
André Blattmann (born 1956), Swiss military officer
Aud Blattmann (born 1937), Norwegian politician
René Blattmann (born 1948), Bolivian judge, lawyer and politician
Trond Henry Blattmann (born 1964), Norwegian politician

See also
Blattman